The Bookseller of Kabul is a non-fiction book written by Norwegian journalist Åsne Seierstad, about a bookseller, Shah Muhammad Rais (whose name was changed to Sultan Khan), and his family in Kabul, Afghanistan, published in Norwegian in 2002 and English in 2003. It takes a novelistic approach, focusing on characters and the daily issues that they face.

Background
Åsne Seierstad entered Afghanistan two weeks after the September 11 attacks and followed the Northern Alliance into Kabul where she spent three months. Disguising herself by wearing a burka, she lived with a bookseller and his family in Kabul which provided her with a unique opportunity to describe life as ordinary Afghan citizens saw it.

Themes
As well as giving a historical account of events in Afghanistan as democracy is established, Seierstad focuses on the conditions of Afghan women who still live very much under the domination of men—Afghan traditions allow for polygamy and arranged marriage. She also addresses the conflict between westernization and traditional Islam, and gives an accessible account of Afghanistan's complex recent history under the rule of the USSR, the Taliban and coalition-supported democracy.

Controversy 
Following global critical acclaim, many of the book's descriptions were contested by Rais, whose second wife Suraia sued the author in Norway for defamation.

On July 24, 2010, Seierstad was found guilty of defamation and “negligent journalistic practices and ordered to pay damages to Suraia Rais, wife of Shah Muhammad Rais”.

Seierstad won an appeal which overturned the previous ruling and cleared the author and her publisher, Cappelen Damm, of invading the privacy of the Rais family, and concluded that the facts of the book were accurate.

Effect on the Rais Family
During a trip to Scandinavia in November 2005, Rais declared he was seeking asylum in either Norway or Sweden, as a political refugee. He felt things revealed about him in Seierstad's book had made life for him and his family unsafe in Afghanistan, where bootleg versions of the book had been published in Persian.

Rais has published his own version of the story, Once Upon a Time There Was a Bookseller in Kabull which has been translated into English and several other languages.

See also

History of Afghanistan
Suhaila Seddiqi
War in Afghanistan (2001–present)

References

Kabul
2002 non-fiction books
Norwegian books
Books about Afghanistan
Cappelen Damm books